Ueltschi is a surname. Notable people with the surname include:

Albert Lee Ueltschi (1917–2012), American aviator
Ernesto Ueltschi (1922–2014), Argentine politician, lawyer and teacher